Yrjö Mäkelä (2 December 1926 – 23 May 2015) was a Finnish athlete. He competed in the men's decathlon at the 1948 Summer Olympics.

References

External links
 

1926 births
2015 deaths
Athletes (track and field) at the 1948 Summer Olympics
Finnish decathletes
Olympic athletes of Finland
Athletes from Helsinki